The Heard-Craig House is a historic house in McKinney, Texas, U.S.. It was built for Stephen and Lillian Heard in 1900.  The house has 7,000 square feet and four floors. In 1970, Kathryn Heard-Craig gifted the house to multiple arts organizations as a place to convene and educate.  In addition to an education hub, the center is also a Regional Art Museum boasting a large collection of Texas Regional Art.  Notable artists include Frank Earl Klepper, Allie Tenant, Thomas Stell, Guy Wiggins, Bruce Crane, and more.  The center also showcases the work of local McKinney artists including Nancy Alexander, Kim Guthrie, Don Chesser, Judy Osentowski, and Mecha Via. Each April, the center hosts a stunning exhibit called, ART MEETS FLORAL, that showcases floral arrangements that replicate paintings.  Tickets for all Heard-Craig Center events can be found at www.heardcraig.org 

The house was designed in the Queen Anne style by architect James E. Flanders.  It has been listed on the National Register of Historic Places since October 8, 1987. The front lobby has beautiful fretwork and there is a One-Of-A-Kind China Cabinet in the dining room.  The china cabinet has two concave doors and three convex doors and is built under the staircase.  Most all of the rooms in the house have stained glass windows.  The Garden leads to a two-story Carriage House used for weddings, parties, bridal showers, and club meetings.

It is a two-story frame building with a hipped roof.

See also

National Register of Historic Places listings in Collin County, Texas
Recorded Texas Historic Landmarks in Collin County

References

External links

Houses on the National Register of Historic Places in Texas
Queen Anne architecture in Texas
Houses completed in 1900
Buildings and structures in Collin County, Texas
Museums in Collin County, Texas